Richard Lepori (born 21 October 1991) is an Italy international rugby league footballer who plays as a  or er for the Swinton Lions in the Betfred Championship.

He has previously played for Oldham, Whitehaven and the Rochdale Hornets.

Background
Richard Lepori was born in St Albans, Hertfordshire, England. After the breakdown of his parents' marriage he moved with his mother to Chorley, Lancashire in 2001. 

He attended Holy Cross RC High School where he was encouraged to play rugby, a sport he fell in love with.

His mother still lives in Chorley, and he has an older brother, Simon Lepori who lives in Stretford, Manchester and is involved with local politics for the Liberal Democrats.

His half brother Dylan Lepori currently plays amateur rugby for Watford Rugby Club

Playing career 
Lepori was previously contracted to play in the academy teams of Salford City Reds, and later Castleford Tigers. He joined  Oldham in the third-tier Championship 1 in 2013, before moving to Queensland, Australia the following year, playing for the Atherton Roosters in the Cairns District Rugby League. On 23 October 2014, it was announced that Lepori would be returning to England in 2015 to join Whitehaven in the second-tier Championship. Lepori left the club in July 2015 after their signing of Louis Jouffret saw him receive no game time. He rejoined recently promoted Oldham in the Championship, before joining the Sedgley Tigers, a rugby union club, in the fourth-tier National League 2 North. Lepori once again rejoined Oldham midseason in March 2017. Lepori joined Rochdale Hornets in October 2017.

References

External links
Swinton Lions profile
Rochdale Hornets profile
Oldham profile
2017 RLWC profile
Italy profile

1991 births
Living people
English rugby league players
English rugby union players
Italy national rugby league team players
Oldham R.L.F.C. players
Rochdale Hornets players
Rugby league fullbacks
Rugby league players from St Albans
Rugby union players from St Albans
Sedgley Park R.U.F.C. players
Swinton Lions players
Whitehaven R.L.F.C. players